Samuel Antwi Kwaku Bonsu also known by the name Solomon Antwi Kwaku Bonsu was a Ghanaian politician in the first republic. He was the Minister of Co-operatives and later Minister of Pensions and National Insurance. He was also the member of parliament for the Sekyere West constituency from 1959 to 1965 and the member of parliament for the Adotobri constituency from 1965 to 1966.

Early life and education
Bonsu was born on 21 November 1921 at Asante Mampong in the Ashanti Region. After completing his Standard Seven, he entered the Presbyterian College of Education (then the Presbyterian Training Colloge) where he obtained his Teachers' Certificate 'A'. He later continued at the Theological Seminary at Akropong graduating in 1941. In 1954 he studied to obtain his GCE Advanced Level certificate prior to proceeding to the United Kingdom to study law at the Middle Temple, London. He was called to the bar as a barrister-at-law in 1957.

life and politics
Bonsu begun as a teacher at the Kumasi Presbyterian Middle School before joining the Kumasi branch of U. T. C. as a Departmental Store Manager.

Bonsu became a private legal practitioner in 1959, and on 12 June that same year, he was sworn into office as the member parliament for the Sekyere West constituency. This was as a result of the seat being vacant due to a law in parliament at the time that deprived members of parliament of their seat if they were unable to be present in parliament for ten (10) consecutive days. The former occupant of the seat; R. R. Amponsah fell victim to this fate as he was detained while being trialled at the time for allegedly plotting with M. K. Apaloo to overthrow Nkrumah. He was appointed deputy minister for Justice in 1960 and a year later, he was appointed Chief of State Protocol for the Queen when she visited Ghana. Bonsu served as the deputy minister for Justice from 1960 to January 1965 when he was appointed Minister of Co-operatives by the then president Dr. Kwame Nkrumah. In June that same year, he was moved to head the Ministry of Pensions and National Insurance. A month later, he was made member of parliament for the Adotobri constituency. He served in these capacities in the Nkrumah government until Nkrumah was overthrown in February 1966.

See also
 Nkrumah government
 List of MLAs elected in the 1956 Gold Coast legislative election
 List of MPs elected in the 1965 Ghanaian parliamentary election

References

1921 births
Ghanaian MPs 1956–1965
Ghanaian MPs 1965–1966
Convention People's Party (Ghana) politicians
20th-century Ghanaian politicians
Possibly living people
Ghanaian expatriates in the United Kingdom